Athancode Asan is one of the superior poet of Sangam period. He was born at Athancode near kaliyakkavilai of Kanyakumari District of Tamil Nadu. He lived during end Sangam period. Tamil first grammar book Tolkappaim was officially released under his presidency. He is the superior poet of end Sangam period. He had 12 disciples, among them notable are Tolkappiar and Agatiar. He was honored by installing his statue at his native and unveiled by then chief minister of Tamil Nadu MGR in 1984 and library started there by 1986.

Gallery

References

Tamil-language writers
Sangam period